The Seminole Sports Network is a radio network carrying Florida State University Seminoles athletic events, operated by Learfield IMG College. There are 19 stations in the network (13 on A.M., 6 on F.M.) including 3 flagships.

Current network stations

External links
List of affiliates on the team’s website
 List of radio affiliates for the 2010-11 season

Florida State Seminoles
Florida State University
College basketball on the radio in the United States
College football on the radio
Sports radio networks in the United States
Learfield IMG College sports radio networks